WTNT (730 kHz) is a Spanish hits AM radio station licensed to Alexandria, Virginia and serving the Washington metro area.  WTNT is owned and operated by Metro Radio. 730 kHz is a Canadian and Mexican clear-channel frequency.

The station flipped formats to a Spanish music and talk format dubbed "La Capital" on December 1, 2013.

History
WTNT signed on as WPIK December 10, 1945. For many years this station operated as the AM side to country station WXRA 105.9 FM, and for another period as WPKX "Kix Country." For a time 730 simulcast 105.9's next incarnation, classic rock, as WCXR. For a short while in the mid-1980s, the station featured a soul oldies format. It was also WRMR with a nostalgia format for a very short while (not to be confused with the Cleveland, Ohio market WRMR). In 1987, it took the call letters WCPT, and became WBZS in May 1995.

The station was owned by Metropolitan Broadcasting until 1989, Westinghouse Broadcasting from 1989 to 1993, and Viacom from 1993 to 1997. In July 1990, WCPT adopted a simulcast of CNN Headline News. From May 1995 to April 1999, WBZS offered a business news brokered financial advice format.

Then, Mega Communications bought the station and installed a Mexican/tropical music format as "Radio Capital." The call letters changed again in October 2000 to WKDL, call letters that were previously held on what is currently WBQH. This format, along with its FM sisters, lasted until the launch of "Triple X" in July 2006. The WXTR calls were installed at this point; the call letters were used in the past on different stations in the Washington area on two different stations (at 104.1 FM and 820 AM).

In addition, Red Zebra planned to acquire WGYS 103.9 FM in Braddock Heights, Maryland and WGMS 104.1 FM in Waldorf, Maryland via a recent acquisition with Bonneville International, but called the deal off weeks later.

Media Web site DCRTV.com first reported on July 24, 2010 that WXTR had dropped the Spanish Sports Radio programming of ESPN Deportes Radio and switched to a "pop and soul oldies" format, calling itself "Non-Stop Classic Hits, XTRA-AM". WXTR would quickly pick ESPN Deportes Radio days later. DCRTV.com would again report that on October 9, 2010 that WXTR would drop Spanish Sports Radio for Oldies.  WXTR's Spanish radio website and webstream was down as of October 13, 2010. The web site Radio Business Report reported the flip, quoting a station exec as saying the station would fill "a void in the marketplace". WXTR also revived the "XTRA Oldies" nickname, which was used on the FM dial at the 104.1 FM facility. For the short amount of time the format was carried, it was the only AM station broadcasting English-language music on a full-time basis in the Washington D.C./Baltimore area.  However, this change lasted only several days, as Red Zebra announced that WXTR would be sold off to Metro Radio that October 18. The WTNT call letters were moved from the 570 kHz facility, which changed to the WSPZ call letters, and picked up WTNT's previous conservative talk format, which was dropped for sports/talk in early September.

WTNT must power down to 25 watts at night in order to protect clear-channel CKAC in Montreal, rendering it all but unlistenable at night.  In 2006, while it was still WXTR under Snyder's ownership, it sought to boost its power to 28,000 watts in the daytime and 20,000 watts in the night hours.  The power boost would have given WXTR coverage comparable to the other major AM stations in the capital.

On December 1, 2013 WTNT changed their format from talk to Spanish AC, branded as "La Capital".

It eventually rebranded to "La Mega Capital" and moved towards a more Spanish contemporary format.

Translators
In addition to the main station, WTNT has two FM translators to widen its broadcast area.

References

External links

TNT (AM)
Spanish-language radio stations in the United States
Radio stations established in 1945
1945 establishments in Virginia
Westinghouse Broadcasting